Latirus is a genus of sea snails, marine gastropod molluscs in the family Fasciolariidae, the spindle snails, the tulip snails and their allies.

Species
Species within the genus Latirus include:

 Latirus abnormis G.B. Sowerby III, 1849
 Latirus acuminatus (Kiener, 1840)
 Latirus alboapicatus Smith, 1902
 Latirus amplustre (Dillwyn, 1817)
 Latirus andamanicus Smth, 1894
 Latirus anosyanus Bozzetti, 2018
 Latirus barclayi (Reeve, 1847)
 Latirus belcheri (Reeve, 1847)
 Latirus castaneus (Gray, 1839)
 Latirus constrictus (Koch, 1845)
 Latirus deynzerorum Emerson & Sage, 1990
 † Latirus elachistus Lozouet, 1999 
 Latirus elegans Adams, 1855
 Latirus fallax (Küster & Kobelt, 1874) 
 Latirus fenestratus (Anton, 1838) (nomen dubium)
 Latirus filamentosus (Küster & Kobelt, 1874)
 Latirus filmerae (G.B. Sowerby III, 1900)
 Latirus gibbulus (Gmelin, 1791)
 Latirus granatus (Koch, 1845)
 Latirus hesterae Melvill, 1891
 Latirus impressus (Anton, 1838) (nomen dubium)
 † Latirus lhommei Staadt, 1908
 Latirus lignosus (Gmelin, 1791)
 Latirus maculatus (Reeve, 1847)
 Latirus mannophorus (Melvill, 1891)
 Latirus marrowi Lyons & Snyder, 2015
 Latirus maxwelli (Pilsbry, 1939)
 Latirus meli Bozzetti, 2014
 † Latirus metalleus Lozouet, 1999 
 Latirus minutisquamosus (Reeve, 1848)
 Latirus modestus (Philippi, 1844)
 Latirus nassoides (Reeve, 1847)
 Latirus niger Odhner, 1917
 Latirus ornatus Lyons & Snyder, 2015
 Latirus philberti (Récluz, 1844)
 Latirus philippinensis Snyder, 2003
 Latirus pictus (Reeve, 1847)
 Latirus plicatulus (Anton, 1838) (nomen dubium)
 Latirus polygonus (Gmelin, 1791)
 Latirus poppei Lyons & Snyder, 2015
 † Latirus pseudoaturensis Lozouet, 1999 
 Latirus pulleini Verco, 1895
 Latirus purpuroides (Lesson, 1842)
 Latirus rhodostoma (Adams, 1855)
 Latirus rousi G.B. Sowerby III, 1886
 Latirus rufus (Reeve, 1848)
 Latirus rugosissimus (Locard, 1897) 
 Latirus singularis G.B. Sowerby III, 1903
 Latirus spinosus (Philippi, 1845)
 Latirus spirorbulus (Menke, 1829)
 Latirus stenomphalus Habe & Kosuge, 1966
 Latirus strangei (Adams, 1855)
 Latirus tenuistratus Sowerby
 Latirus tigroides Kilburn, 1975
 Latirus troscheli Löbbecke, 1882
 Latirus vexillulum (Reeve, 1842)
 Latirus vischii Bozzetti, 2008
 Latirus walkeri Melvill, 1894
 Latirus williamlyonsi Petuch & Sargent, 2011
 Latirus xantochrous (Tapparone-Canefri, 1881)

Species brought into synonymy  

 Latirus abbotti Snyder, 2003: synonym of Polygona abbotti
 Latirus aldeynzeri Garcia, 2001: synonym of  Hemipolygona aldeynzeri
 Latirus anapetes Woodring, 1964: synonym of Polygona anapetes (Woodring, 1964)
 Latirus angulatus (Röding, 1798): synonym of Polygona angulata
 Latirus annulata Röding, 1798: synonym of Pustulatirus annulatus
 Latirus armatus Adams A., 1854: synonym of  Hemipolygona armata
 Latirus attenuata (Reeve, 1847): synonym of Pustulatirus attenuatus (Reeve, 1847)
 Latirus aurantiacus Montfort, 1810: synonym of Latirus gibbulus (Gmelin, 1791) 
 Latirus australiensis Reeve: synonym of Peristernia australiensis
 Latirus bairstowi G.B. Sowerby III, 1886: synonym of Dolicholatirus bairstowi
 Latirus balicasagensis Bozzetti, 1997: synonym of Fusolatirus balicasagensis
 Latirus bayeri Petuch, 2001: synonym of Polygona bayeri
 Latirus beckyae Snyder, 2000: synonym of  Hemipolygona beckyae
 Latirus bernadensis Bullock, 1947: synonym of Polygona bernadensis (Bullock, 1974) (original combination)
 Latirus bonnieae Smythe, 1985: synonym of  Hemipolygona bonnieae
 Latirus brazieri Angas: synonym of Nodopelagia brazieri
 Latirus brinkae Lussi, 1996: synonym of Fusolatirus brinkae (Lussi, 1996) (original combination)
 Latirus candelabrum (Reeve, 1847): synonym of Latirus philberti (Récluz, 1844)
 Latirus carinifer (Lamarck, 1816): synonym of Hemipolygona carinifera
 Latirus carotianus Tapparone-Canefri, 1879: synonym of Peristernia carotiana (Tapparone Canefri, 1881) (original combination)
 Latirus carpentariensis Hedley, 1812: synonym of Fusolatirus paetelianus (Kobelt, 1874) (junior synonym)
 Latirus centrifugus (Dall, 1915): synonym of Hemipolygona centrifuga
 Latirus clausicaudatus (Hinds, 1844): synonym of Crassibougia clausicaudata (Hinds, 1844)
 Latirus cloveri Snyder, 2003: synonym of  Fusolatirus suduirauti
 Latirus clovery Snyder, 2003 : wrong spelling of Latirus cloveri
 Latirus concentrica (Reeve, 1847): synonym of  Polygona concentrica
 Latirus concinnus Tapparone-Canefri, 1880: synonym of Latirus maculatus var. concinna Tapparone-Canefri, 1880 
 Latirus cuna Petuch, 1990: synonym of  Hemipolygona cuna
 Latirus devyanae Rios, Costa & Calvo, 1994: synonym of Polygona devyanae (Rios, Costa & Calvo, 1994)
 Latirus elsiae Kilburn, 1975: synonym of  Fusolatirus elsiae
 Latirus eppi Melvill, 1891: synonym of  Pustulatirus eppi
 Latirus ernesti Melvill, 1910: synonym of Teralatirus ernesti
 Latirus fastigium (Reeve, 1847): synonym of Benimakia fastigium (Reeve, 1847)
 Latirus filosa (Schubert & Wagner, 1829): wrong name for  Latirus filosus
 Latirus filosus (Schubert & Wagner, 1829): synonym of  Polygona filosa
 Latirus flavidus Adams, 1855: synonym of Benimakia flavida (A. Adams, 1855) (original combination)
 Latirus formosior Melvill, 1891: synonym of Fusolatirus formosior
 Latirus hemphilli Hertlein & Strong, 1951: synonym of  Pustulatirus hemphilli
 Latirus infundibulum (Gmelin, 1791): synonym of Polygona infundibula
 Latirus iris (Lightfoot, 1786): synonym of Turrilatirus iris
 Latirus jucundus McGinty, 1940: synonym of  Polygona jucunda
 Latirus kandai Kuroda, 1950: synonym of  Fusolatirus kandai
 Latirus labronicus (Monterosato, 1884): synonym of Fusinus labronicus
 Latirus lacteum Matthews-Cascou, Matthews & Rocha, 1991: synonym of  Polygona lactea
 Latirus lanceolatus (Reeve, 1847): synonym of Benimakia lanceolata (Reeve, 1847)
 Latirus lautus (Reeve, 1847): synonym of Turrilatirus lautus (Reeve, 1847)
 Latirus martini Snyder, 1988: synonym of  Polygona martini
 Latirus maximus G. B. Sowerby, 1893: synonym of Viridifusus maximus (G.B. Sowerby III, 1893)
 Latirus mcmurrayi Clench & Aguayo, 1941: synonym of Bullockus mcmurrayi (Clench & Aguayo, 1941)
 Latirus mediamericanus Hertlein & Strong, 1951: synonym of Pustulatirus mediamericanus
 Latirus mollis (G.B. Sowerby III, 1913): synonym of Viridifusus mollis (G. B. Sowerby III, 1913)
 Latirus mosselensis Tomlin, 1932: synonym of Hemipolygona mosselensis
 Latirus nassatula Lamarck: synonym of Peristernia nassatula
 Latirus nematus Woodring, 1928: synonym of Polygona nemata (Woodring, 1928)
 Latirus ogum Petuch, 1979: synonym of Pustulatirus ogum (Petuch, 1979)
 Latirus praestantior Melvill, 1892: synonym of  Pustulatirus praestantior
 Latirus profetai (Nofroni, 1982): synonym of  Fusinus profetai
 Latirus paeteliana (Küster & Kobelt, 1874): synonym of  Fusolatirus paetelianus
 Latirus pagodaeformis (Melvill, 1899): synonym of Fusolatirus pagodaeformis
 Latirus pearsoni Snyder, 2002: synonym of  Fusolatirus pearsoni
 Latirus recurvirostra (Schubert & Wagner, 1829): synonym of Hemipolygona recurvirostra
 Latirus rosadoi Bozzetti, 2002: synonym of Benimakia rosadoi (Bozzetti, 2002)
 Latirus rosaponti (Lesson, 1842): synonym of Nodolatirus nodatus (Gmelin, 1791)
 Latirus sanguiflua (Reeve, 1847): synonym of Turrilatirus sanguifluus
 Latirus sanguineus (Wood, 1828): synonym of  Pustulatirus sanguineus
 Latirus sarinae Snyder, 2003: synonym of Fusolatirus sarinae
 Latirus socorroensis Hertlein & Strong, 1951: synonym of Polygona socorroensis
 Latirus staminatus Garrard, 1966: synonym of Granulifusus staminatus (Garrard, 1966) 
 Latirus suduirauti (Fraussen, 2003): synonym of Fusolatirus suduirauti
 Latirus tumens Carpenter, 1856: synonym of Polygona tumens
 Latirus turritus (Gmelin, 1791): synonym of Turrilatirus turritus
 Latirus unifasciatus (Wood, 1828): synonym of Tarantinaea lignaria (Linnaeus, 1758)
 Latirus varai Bullock, 1970: synonym of  Hemipolygona varai
 Latirus vermeiji Petuch, 1986: synonym of Polygona vermeiji (Petuch, 1986)
 Latirus virginensis Abbott, 1958: synonym of Pustulatirus virginensis

References

External links
  Geerat J. Vermeij and # Martin Avery Snyder, Shell characters and taxonomy of Latirus and related fasciolariid groups, Journal of Molluscan Studies, vol. 72, nr. 4, pp. 413-424, 2006

Fasciolariidae
Gastropod genera